Phyllactinia is a genus of fungi in the family Erysiphaceae. The type species is Phyllactinia suffulta. Species in this genus are plant pathogens, causing powdery mildew.

References

Erysiphales
Fungal plant pathogens and diseases
Taxa named by Joseph-Henri Léveillé
Taxa described in 1851
Leotiomycetes genera